Manuel "Manu" Antonio Molina Valero (born 20 November 1991) is a Spanish footballer who plays as an attacking midfielder for Real Zaragoza.

Club career
Born in Huelva, Andalusia, Molina was a product of local Recreativo de Huelva youth system. After completing his football grooming with RCD Espanyol, he made his first-team debut at only 18, playing the last minute of the 3–1 La Liga home win over Getafe CF on 29 August 2010. One month later, he started and finished the match at Real Madrid, but the Catalans lost it 3–0.

Molina was loaned to SD Huesca of Segunda División for the 2011–12 season. He scored his first goal for the Aragonese on 17 September 2011, in a 3–3 home draw against CD Alcoyano.

In the following seasons, Molina represented a host of clubs in the Segunda División B. The exception to this was 2014–15, when he appeared in the second tier with Recreativo de Huelva.

On 19 July 2022, after two years as a regular starter at UD Ibiza, Molina signed a two-year contract with Real Zaragoza in the second tier.

References

External links

1991 births
Living people
Footballers from Huelva
Spanish footballers
Association football midfielders
La Liga players
Segunda División players
Segunda División B players
Tercera División players
RCD Espanyol B footballers
RCD Espanyol footballers
SD Huesca footballers
Valencia CF Mestalla footballers
Recreativo de Huelva players
Deportivo Fabril players
Lleida Esportiu footballers
Salamanca CF UDS players
Real Balompédica Linense footballers
UD Ibiza players
Real Zaragoza players